Omar Beća (born 1 January 2002) is a Bosnian professional footballer who plays as a defensive midfielder for Bosnian Premier League club Željezničar and the Bosnia and Herzegovina U21 national team.

He started his professional career at Željezničar.

Club career

Željezničar
Beća started playing football at hometown club Željezničar. On 27 November 2020, he made his professional debut against Mladost Doboj Kakanj at the age of 18. In July 2021, Beća signed his first professional contract with Željezničar. He scored his first professional goal for the club on 20 March 2022, in a league game against Velež Mostar.

On 27 June 2022, Beća extended his contract with Željezničar.

International career
Beća represented Bosnia and Herzegovina on various youth levels.

Personal life
Beća's father Damir was also a professional footballer and is currently a football manager.

Career statistics

Club

References

External links
Omar Beća at Sofascore

2002 births
Living people
Footballers from Sarajevo
Bosnia and Herzegovina footballers
Bosnia and Herzegovina youth international footballers
Association football midfielders
FK Željezničar Sarajevo players
Premier League of Bosnia and Herzegovina players